Oak Lake is a community Kenora District in northwestern Ontario.

Communities in Kenora District